Do Badan (English: Two Bodies) is a 1966 Hindi film directed by Raj Khosla, and starring Manoj Kumar, Asha Parekh,  Simi Garewal and Pran. The music is by Ravi. The film became a big hit at the box office.

The film idea was suggested by Manoj Kumar, who asked Khosla to accompany him for a show of Deedar (1951), directed by Nitin Bose, which was having a rerun in local theatres. Thereafter, the story of Do Badan was written after reworking its story line and the screenplay was written by G.R. Kamat.

Plot 
Vikas (Manoj Kumar) comes from a poor family, and is attending college so that he can complete his studies, get a job, and look after himself and his dad. He meets with wealthy Asha (Asha Parekh) at this college, and after a few misunderstandings, both fall in love. Vikas' dad passes away during the exams. Because Vikas leaves to attend the funeral, he is unable to complete his studies. Asha feels sorry for him and arranges to get him employed with her dad, without telling Vikas about it. Asha's dad wants her to marry Ashwini (Pran), and he soon announces their engagement.

Ashwini finds out that Asha is in love with Vikas, and arranges an accident for Vikas. Vikas survives the accident, but loses his eyesight. After this incident, Vikas does not want to burden Asha, and strikes up a new friendship with Dr. Anjali (Simi Garewal). Meanwhile, Ashwini informs Asha that Vikas has died in the accident. Asha loses interest in life after listening to the news of Vikas's death. Ashwini then meets Vikas and requests him to convince Asha that he does not love her any more. Vikas agrees and convinces Asha that he is having an affair with Dr. Anjali. Asha marries Ashwini but refuses to live in the same room as he.

Vikas starts singing to earn money. Asha meets Vikas when he is singing in a hotel event. Dr.Anjali tells Asha the real story about Vikas's true love and how selfish Ashwin was. Asha realizes and wants to apologize to Vikas but Ashwin does not allow Asha to do so.

Dr. Anjali asks Vikas to get an eye operation, but Vikas refuses. One day, Dr. Anjali visits Asha and asks her to persuade Vikas to undergo the operation. While Asha is asking Vikas to undergo the operation, Ashwini takes her away and locks her in a room. She feels suicidal.

One day Asha's uncle goes to meet her and feels saddened by her condition. He takes her to her father's home. Within three days, Asha becomes sick and doctors are unable to do anything for her. Meanwhile, Vikas's eye operation is successful. Ashwini apologizes to Asha. He goes to Vikas and tells him about Asha's condition. Vikas and Ashwini go to Asha. She dies after taking one look at Vikas. He is not able to bear that and also dies. In the end, Ashwini and Asha's family find Vikas and Asha together.

Cast & Characters

Soundtrack 
The songs of the movie were huge hits. The music was composed by Ravi and the lyrics were authored by Shakeel Badayuni, with memorable songs such as "Bhari Duniya Mein Aakhir Dil Ko", "Naseeb Main Jiske Jo Likha Tha", "Raha Gardishon Mein Hardam Mere Ishq Ka Sitara" rendered into tracks by the mesmerizing voice of Mohammed Rafi; "Lo Aa Gayi Unki Yaad Woh Nahin Aaye" by Lata Mangeshkar and "Jab Chali Thandi Hawa" by Asha Bhosle.

Awards and nominations
Filmfare Best Supporting Actress Award--Simi Garewal
Filmfare Nomination for Best Music Director--Ravi
Filmfare Nomination for Best Lyricist--Shakeel Badayuni for the song "Naseeb Mein Jiske"
Filmfare Nomination for Best Playback Singer--Lata Mangeshkar for the song "Loo Aa Gayi

References

External links 
 
  Do Badan on YouTube
1966 films
1960s Hindi-language films
Films directed by Raj Khosla
Films scored by Ravi